Léane Labrèche-Dor (born July 6, 1988) is a Canadian actress. She is most noted for her performance in the film Laughter (Le Rire), for which she received a Prix Iris nomination for Best Actress at the 22nd Quebec Cinema Awards.

Originally from Saint-Lambert, Quebec, she is a graduate of the National Theatre School of Canada.

In 2020 she appeared in Escouade 99, the Quebec television adaptation of Brooklyn Nine-Nine. She was also previously a cast member of SNL Québec, the shortlived Quebec adaptation of Saturday Night Live, and its spinoff series Le nouveau show. She has also appeared in the films Family First (Chien de garde) and Lines of Escape (Lignes de fuite).

She is in a romantic relationship with her frequent costar Mickaël Gouin.

References

External links

1988 births
21st-century Canadian actresses
Canadian film actresses
Canadian stage actresses
Canadian television actresses
Actresses from Quebec
French Quebecers
National Theatre School of Canada alumni
People from Saint-Lambert, Quebec
Living people
Canadian sketch comedians